Boris Alterman (born May 4, 1970) is an Israeli chess Grandmaster, FIDE Senior Trainer (2010), advisor of the Junior chess program.

He started playing chess at the age of 7.  His career highlights include earning the IM title in 1991, and the GM title in 1992. He is the winner of the following Open and GM tournaments: Haifa 1993, Bad Homburg 1996, Rishon LeZion 1996, Beijing 1995 and 1997, and Munich 1992.

He plays for Rishon LeZion chess club. He does video lectures on the Internet Chess Club Website, and has a series called "Gambit Guide" which covers openings like the Danish Gambit, Cochrane Gambit, Evans Gambit, Budapest Gambit, and the Fried Liver Attack.

On the April 2009 FIDE list, he has an Elo rating of 2572.

See also
 List of Jewish chess players

References

External links 
 
 
 
 GM Boris Alterman Chess Lessons

1970 births
Living people
Chess grandmasters
Chess Olympiad competitors
Chess coaches
Jewish chess players
Israeli chess players
Ukrainian chess players
Ukrainian Jews
Ukrainian emigrants to Israel
Sportspeople from Kharkiv